Borodulikha is a district of Abai Region in eastern Kazakhstan. The administrative center of the district is the selo of Borodulikha. Population:

References

Districts of Kazakhstan
East Kazakhstan Region